Lake Itawamba is a reservoir in the U.S. state of Mississippi.

Lake Itawamba derives its name from the Indian name of Levi Colbert, a Chickasaw leader.

References

Itawamba
Bodies of water of Itawamba County, Mississippi
Mississippi placenames of Native American origin